Wawatam Lighthouse is an automated, modern lighthouse that guards the harbor of St. Ignace, Michigan, in the Straits of Mackinac. Originally completely nonfunctional, it was erected in 1998 by the Michigan Department of Transportation (MDOT) near Monroe, Michigan as an iconic roadside attraction at a welcome center that greeted northbound drivers on Interstate 75 (I-75). After serving in this capacity for six years, the structure was threatened in 2004 when MDOT decided to rebuild the welcome center and demolish the tower.

Demolition was averted when the St. Ignace civic leaders for the Straits of Mackinac municipality, which had never had a light tower, heard of the opportunity and asked that the welded steel tower be given to them, this time for use in real life. Over a two-year period, the redundant structure was cut apart, trucked to St. Ignace, and re-erected, this time as a functional aid to navigation with a working light. The "new" lighthouse was re-lighted in St. Ignace in August 2006. As of 2023, it is one of the final working light towers to be erected in the waters of the United States.

History
The lighthouse was originally built by MDOT in 1998 as an architectural folly at the Monroe welcome center on I-75 near Monroe, Michigan, in the southeastern corner of the state near the Ohio border. It was a lighthouse structure that was constructed far away from navigational waters as an element of the tourist heritage of the state. In 2004, MDOT decided to renovate the center and declared the structure obsolete. It was scheduled to be demolished. After concerns were raised about this decision, the state government agreed that the structure should be dismantled and moved to a location where it would be useful. Serendipitously, while attending a conference for municipal officials, St. Ignace civic leaders learned of its availability.

When it was at the welcome center, the hexagonal tower was painted white, with green and red trim. The original lighthouse was welded by a single man; Ed Morris, owner of the Morris Machine Shop in Bay City, Michigan, was chosen because of his skill as a welder. The lighthouse was one of three that he built for Michigan welcome centers. The other two were at New Buffalo, Michigan and Clare, Michigan. 

Morris worked with eight men and it took about three months to complete the projects. As Morris explained to the St. Ignace News, "his lighthouses were to be designed as museum-quality attractions at welcome centers ... to make an imposing first impression on visitors." They had a  base. Morris opined that anything in excess of 16 m was beyond his bailiwick. He also suggested that its steel structure should make it highly resistant to storms.

Transporting the structure by truck north from Monroe to St. Ignace cost $20,000 by itself. The project cost $50,000 all total including the transporting, repair, and erection. Half was provided by the Michigan Waterways Commission and small community donations paid the rest. The lighthouse was reassembled using a crane in 2006. Based upon a survey of residents, it was named Wawatam Lighthouse in honor of a railroad car ferry that had been home-ported in St. Ignace for many decades, SS Chief Wawatam. After reassembly, the Wawatam Lighthouse was relit on August 20, 2006. The lighthouse is now an official United States Coast Guard privately maintained aid to navigation, USCG 7–12608, on Lake Huron. Maintenance is by the city of St. Ignace. Public access is by walking the pier.

Wawatam Pier

The chosen location for the rebuilt lighthouse was the former St. Ignace railroad pier, originally built in the 1800s as the home port of a train ferry. Operated by a joint venture that included St. Ignace's Duluth, South Shore and Atlantic Railway, the ferry shuttled railroad cars across the Straits of Mackinac. Starting soon after its launch date in 1911, these duties were fulfilled by the  Chief Wawatam. Designed by Frank E. Kirby and built by the Toledo Shipbuilding Company, the Chief "carried as many as 28 rail cars per trip between Mackinaw City and St. Ignace." The ferry boat, in turn, had been named in honor of a leading Straits of Mackinac local resident of the 1700s, the Odawa clan leader Wawatam.

The St. Ignace dock collapsed in 1984, and in 1986 the successor railroad abandoned the last rail link to St. Ignace. This ended the ferry era. A truncated stretch of tracks and the track elevator (which oriented the tracks so the cars could be loaded on the ferry) were still visible as of 2014. Erected in 2012 by the city, it was designed and carved by Tom Paquin and Sally Paquin, local artists.

Status
The new lighthouse is duly noted on newer navigational charts. and operates year-round. It not only guides mariners but is a beacon for snowmobilers traveling across the frozen Straits of Mackinac to and from Mackinac Island in winter. The lighthouse and harbor also serve Coast Guard ice breakers, such as the tug Katmai Bay and heavy duty breaker Mackinaw.

The lighthouse was the featured lighthouse of the Michigan Lighthouse festival in 2015. It is the subject of a jig saw puzzle. As of 2017, this was the latest addition to Michigan's 150 listed (including historical and now demolished) lighthouses.

Location
The Wawatam Lighthouse is located in downtown St. Ignace, at the eastern end of McCann Street near its intersection with North State Street, St. Ignace's main waterfront highway.

Notes

References

Further reading

External links

Boat cruises passed scenic Wawatam Lighthouse in colorful light of dawn, Saint Ignace, Upper Michigan
The freeze is on: Coast Guard begins ice-breaking on western Great Lakes
Top 12. Best Tourist Attractions in Saint Ignace, Michigan

Lighthouses in Mackinac County, Michigan
Lighthouses completed in 1998